The Vin Garbutt Songbook Vol 1 is a 2003 folk music album by Vin Garbutt. It is a compilation of 17 songs from his earlier albums, all written by Garbutt between 1970 and 2000.

Track listing
 The Valley of Tees
 Not for the First Time
 The By-Pass Syndrome
 Filipino Maid
 The Land of Three Rivers (John North)
 England My England
 Welcome Home Howard Green
 When the Tide Turns
 Old Cissy Lee
 Dormanstown Jimmy
 Slaggy Island Farewell
 Lynda
 Darwin to Dili
 The Troubles of Erin
 El Salvador
 Danny Danielle
 The One Legged Beggar

Vin Garbutt albums
2003 compilation albums